Hehn is a surname. Notable people with the surname include:

Hans-Jürgen Hehn (born 1944), German fencer
Keri Hehn (born 1981), American swimmer
Paul N. Hehn, American historian
Sascha Hehn (born 1954), German actor

Places
Hehn, a quarter of the city of Mönchengladbach, Germany

See also
Hen and Henn

Surnames from nicknames